Huub Loeffen (born 11 January 1972) is a Dutch former professional footballer who played as a forward.

Career
Loeffen was born in Appeltern, Gelderland. In 2001, he retired from professional football due to injuries at age 29. He had appeared in 216 league matches for TOP Oss, SBV Vitesse, FC Zwolle and Willem II.

References

External links
 Profile at Voetbal International
 

1972 births
Living people
Footballers from Nijmegen
Dutch footballers
Association football forwards
Eredivisie players
Eerste Divisie players
SBV Vitesse players
Willem II (football club) players
TOP Oss players